The Federal Correctional Complex, Oakdale (FCC Oakdale) is a United States federal prison complex for male inmates in Louisiana. It is operated by the Federal Bureau of Prisons, a division of the United States Department of Justice, and consists of two main facilities:

 The Federal Correctional Institution, Oakdale (FCI Oakdale): houses low-security male inmates.
 The Federal Detention Center, Oakdale (FDC Oakdale): an administrative facility housing male pre-trial and holdover inmates. An adjacent satellite prison camp houses minimum-security male inmates.

Notable prisoners 

 Former WorldCom CEO Bernard Ebbers is serving a 25-year sentence at FCC Oakdale for his involvement in the accounting scandal that toppled that company. 
 Former Louisiana governor Edwin Edwards served over eight years of a ten-year sentence for his involvement in a 2000 riverboat gambling racketeering case.
 Former Governor Don Siegelman of Alabama was serving a seven-year sentence but was released in 2008 pending appeal. 
 Andrew Fastow, the former Chief Financial Officer for Enron Corporation, served six years and was released in 2011.
 Former New Orleans city councilman Oliver Thomas served a 37-month federal prison sentence after pleading guilty to accepting bribes, served the duration of his sentence at the Oakdale complex.
 Patrick Jones, a 47-year old inmate at the prison in became the first fatality of COVID-19 in a federal prison on March 29, 2020. Five other inmates were also infected.

See also

List of U.S. federal prisons
Federal Bureau of Prisons
Incarceration in the United States

References

External links
Official website

Prisons in Louisiana
Buildings and structures in Allen Parish, Louisiana
Oakdale